Hans Wolff may refer to:

 Hans Wolff (aviator) (1895–1918), World War I flying ace
 Hans Wolff (director) (1911–1979), German film editor and director
 , 1910–1969), German Obersturmbannführer
 Hans Julius Wolff (1898–1976), German jurist
 Hans Walter Wolff (1911–1993), German Protestant theologian
  (1896–1976), German Doctor of Engineering

See also 
 Hans Wolf (b. 1940), American cyclist